The 2014–15 Northern Kentucky Norse women's basketball team will represent Northern Kentucky University in the 2014–15 NCAA Division I women's basketball season. The Norse were coached by third year head coach Dawn Plitzuweit and were members of the Atlantic Sun Conference. They finished the season 19-14, 8-6 in A-Sun play to finish in third place This was the final year the Norse are ineligible to participate in the A-Sun tournament and cannot make the NCAA Tournament due to their transition from D2 to D1. However, they were eligible to compete the 2015 Atlantic Sun women's basketball tournament and advance to the championship game which they lost to Florida Gulf Coast. They were invited to the Women's Basketball Invitational where they lost in the first round to Marshall.

This was their final season in the Atlantic Sun before moving to the Horizon League.

Media
All home games and conference road will be shown on ESPN3 or A-Sun.TV. Non conference road games will typically be available on the opponents website. Audio broadcasts of Norse games can be found on the NKU Portal with Andrew Kappes and Steve Moeller on the call.

Roster

Schedule

|-
!colspan=9 style="background:#FFD700; color:#FFFFFF;"|Regular Season

|-
! colspan=9 style="background:white;"|Atlantic Sun tournament

|-
! colspan=9 style="background:white;"|WBI

See also
 2014–15 Northern Kentucky Norse men's basketball team

References

Northern Kentucky
Northern Kentucky Norse women's basketball seasons